The Kigongo–Busisi Bridge, also referred to as the Mwanza Gulf Bridge, is a bridge under construction in Tanzania. It is reported to be the longest bridge in East Africa and the sixth-longest on the African continent. As part of this road infrastructure project, a  tarmacked road will be constructed to link the eastern end of the bridge to the city of Mwanza.

Location
The geographical coordinates of the Kigongo–Busisi Bridge are 02°43'29.0"S, 32°52'21.0"E (Latitude:-2.724722; Longitude:32.872500).

Overview
Before the construction of this bridge, there was no road link between Kigongo and Busisi. A ferry was the only means of connection between the two sides. The ferry takes 35 minutes to travel the distance, but pre-boarding, boarding, travel, and disembarking can last as long as three hours. An average of 1,600 automobiles cross the Gulf of Mwanza using the ferry, every 24 hours. That number is expected to increase to 10,200 very 24 hours, when the bridge is completed, according to the Tanzania National Roads Agency (TANROADS).

In 2019, the government of Tanzania contracted a consortium of two Chinese state-owned engineering and construction companies to design and build this transport infrastructure project. The two firms are China Civil Engineering Construction Corporation (CCECC) and China Railway 15th Bureau (CR15B).

Construction costs and timeline
At the start of construction in December 2019, the contract price was reported as TSh:699 billion, fully funded by the Tanzanian government, with completion initially planned for 2023. In July 2021, the progress of works was reported at 27 percent. At that time, the contract price was reported as US$308.88 million. The new completion date was reported as 2024.

As of July 2022, completion was estimated at 47.3 percent. At that time, a total of 776 jobs had been created by the project, of which 720 jobs (92.8 percent) were filled by Tanzanians and 56 jobs (7.2 percent) were taken up by non-Tanzanians.

See also
List of roads in Tanzania

References

External links
Brief Project Profile

Bridges in Tanzania
Geita Region
Mwanza Region
Bridges under construction
Buildings and structures in Tanzania